The Himalayan prinia (Prinia crinigera) is a species of bird in the family Cisticolidae. It was formerly lumped in with the striped prinia (P. striata) as the striated prinia.

It is found in the Indian Subcontinent and parts of China, with its range generally following the Himalayas. It is distributed in the countries of Afghanistan, Pakistan, India, Bhutan, Nepal, and the Yunnan Province in China. Populations in Myanmar, most of China, and Taiwan are now considered to belong to P. striata following a 2019 study. Both P. crinigera and P. striata are sympatric in the Yunnan Province.

There are four known subspecies: P. c. striatula, which is known from the mountains of Afghanistan and west Pakistan; P. c. crinigera, which is distributed from north Pakistan to Arunachal Pradesh in northeast India; P. c. yunnanensis, which is restricted to the northwestern Yunnan Province in China, and P. c. bangsi in the southeastern Yunnan Province. P. c. bangsi was formerly considered a subspecies of Deignan's prinia (formerly the brown prinia) until the 2019 study.

References

Himalayan prinia
Birds of the Himalayas
Birds of Northeast India
Birds of Pakistan
Birds of Afghanistan
Himalayan prinia
Taxonomy articles created by Polbot